The Kəpəz 2011–12 season was Kəpəz's second Azerbaijan Premier League season since their promotion back into the top flight. They finished the season in 10th place and were knocked out of the Azerbaijan Cup in the Quarterfinals by Neftchi Baku.

Kəpəz started the season under Mehman Allahverdiyev, who resigned 21 November 2011 and was replaced by Mirbaghir Isayev. Isayev himself resigned on 24 December 2011, being replaced by Fuad Ismayilov on 1 January 2012.

Squad

Transfers

Summer

In:

Out:

Winter

In:

 

Out:

Competitions

Azerbaijan Premier League

Results summary

Results by round

Results

Table

Azerbaijan Premier League Relegation Group

Table

Azerbaijan Cup

Squad statistics

Appearances and goals

|-
|colspan="14"|Players who appeared for Kəpəz no longer at the club:

|}

Goal scorers

Disciplinary record

Monthly awards

External links 
 Kapaz at Soccerway.com

References

Kapaz
Kapaz PFK seasons